Bois d'Arc Creek is a  river in Texas.  It is a tributary of the Red River and is part of the Mississippi River watershed.

It continues northeast past the city of Bonham, then continues through the Caddo National Grassland and joins the Red River at the boundary between Fannin and Lamar counties.

See also
List of rivers of Texas

References

USGS Hydrologic Unit Map - State of Texas (1974)

Rivers of Texas
Tributaries of the Red River of the South
Bodies of water of Grayson County, Texas
Bodies of water of Fannin County, Texas
Bodies of water of Lamar County, Texas